Francesca Neri (born 10 February 1964) is an Italian actress.

Biography
Neri was born in Trento, Italy. She has twice received the Silver Ribbon Award for Best Actress from the Italian National Syndicate of Film Journalists, for Pensavo fosse amore, invece era un calesse, directed by Massimo Troisi (1991) and Carne trémula (Live Flesh) (1997).

She has also received three nominations for the David di Donatello Award, as Best Actress in Il dolce rumore della vita and Io amo Andrea (both 1999) and as Best Supporting Actress for La felicità non costa niente (2003).

Other notable films include her three films in Spain: Live Flesh  (1997, by Pedro Almodóvar), ¡Dispara! (Outrage, 1993, by Carlos Saura), both with her own voice speaking Spanish, and sex drama film Las edades de Lulú (The Ages of Lulu, 1990, by Bigas Luna, where she's dubbed into Spanish).

After years of highly acclaimed work in Europe, she first received widespread notice in the United States when she played the role of Allegra, wife of the Inspector Rinaldo Pazzi in the Hollywood blockbuster, Hannibal in 2001.  In 2002, she co-starred  in Collateral Damage alongside Arnold Schwarzenegger, playing the Colombian wife of Claudio Perrini, a terrorist known as the Wolf.

Personal life
Neri has one son, Rocco (born 1999), with actor Claudio Amendola. She also has two stepdaughters from Claudio's previous marriage, including voice actress Alessia Amendola.

Selected filmography

References

External links

1964 births
Italian film actresses
Living people
People from Trento
Centro Sperimentale di Cinematografia alumni
Nastro d'Argento winners
20th-century Italian actresses
21st-century Italian actresses